The crab-eating frog (Fejervarya cancrivora) is a frog native to south-eastern Asia including Taiwan, China, the Philippines and more rarely as far west as Orissa in India. It has also been introduced to Guam, and was most likely introduced from Taiwan. It inhabits mangrove swamps and marshes and is one of only 144 known modern amphibians which can tolerate brief excursions into seawater.

This frog can tolerate marine environments (immersion in sea water for brief periods or brackish water for extended periods) by increasing urea production and retention, and by remaining slightly hyperosmotic within urea and sodium flux. Adults can survive in salt water with salinity as high as 2.8%, and tadpoles can survive salinities as high as 3.9%.

Diet
The food sources of the crab-eating frog are mainly determined by the locally available prey. Near fresh water, its diet consists largely of insects. But in an environment with brackish water, small crustaceans, including crabs, form the main part.

Human consumption
In Southeast Asia, the crab-eating frog is locally hunted for food and is often farmed for its edible legs, including in Java, Indonesia.

References

External links
 Amphibian and Reptiles of Peninsular Malaysia -  Fejervarya cancrivora
 Amphibian and Reptiles of Peninsular Malaysia - Fejervarya raja
 Crab-eating Frog at Ecology Asia

Fejervarya
Amphibians of Cambodia
 Amphibians of China
Frogs of India
Amphibians of Laos
Amphibians of Malaysia
Amphibians of the Philippines
Amphibians of Taiwan
Amphibians of Thailand
Amphibians of Vietnam
Amphibians described in 1829
Taxa named by Johann Ludwig Christian Gravenhorst